William Silva de Carvalho  (born 7 April 1992) is a Portuguese professional footballer who plays as a defensive midfielder for La Liga club Real Betis and the Portugal national team.

He spent most of his career with Sporting CP since making his debut with the first team at age 18, going on to appear in 193 competitive matches and win the 2015 Taça de Portugal. In 2018, he signed with Betis.

A full international for Portugal since 2013, Carvalho represented the nation at three World Cups and two European Championships, winning the 2016 edition of the latter tournament.

Early life
Born in Luanda, Carvalho moved to Portugal when he was just a few years old. His grandfather Praia and his uncle Afonso were also footballers and played for Angolan club Progresso Associação do Sambizanga.

Club career

Sporting CP
After moving to Portugal, Carvalho first started playing in the streets and was eventually recruited by Recreios Desportivos de Algueirão. In 2004, he joined União Sport Clube de Mira Sintra, where he was the youngest player in the squad and also their captain. He joined Sporting CP's youth system at age 13, making his official debut with the first team on 3 April 2011 by playing injury time in a 1–1 away draw against Vitória S.C. in the Primeira Liga, then spent six months on loan to C.D. Fátima in the third division.

Still under contract to the Lisbon side, Carvalho played one and a half seasons on loan with Cercle Brugge K.S.V. in the Belgian Pro League starting from January 2012, featuring alongside several Sporting teammates who were there on the same basis. His first professional goal came on 7 April in a 6–4 home win over Oud-Heverlee Leuven, and a year later he helped the team to the final of the Belgian Cup, where they lost 2–0 to K.R.C. Genk at the King Baudouin Stadium.

Carvalho returned for the 2013–14 campaign, being a defensive mainstay for newly appointed coach Leonardo Jardim and scoring his first goal for the side on 27 October, netting the 1–1 equaliser in an eventual 3–1 defeat at FC Porto. During the following summer, he caught the attention of several European clubs, with Arsenal having their £13 million plus Joel Campbell offer rejected. Sporting only acquired the totality of Carvalho's rights in November 2014, with third-party ownership adding to the difficulties of any possible deal.

Carvalho began 2014–15 by seeing a red card – his first ever – in a 1–1 home draw against Académica de Coimbra, receiving his marching orders after a second bookable offence in the 65th minute. He went on to conquer his first trophy, that season's Taça de Portugal, playing the full 120 minutes in the final victory over S.C. Braga.

Among continued transfer speculation linking him with a number of English Premier League sides, including Arsenal again, manager Jorge Jesus claimed that Carvalho would remain at the club. On 14 July 2015, Sporting confirmed that the player had suffered a stress fracture in his tibia which would sideline him for three months. In 2017, approaches from West Ham United caused a breakdown in relations between the two clubs that was later resolved.

On 15 May 2018, Carvalho and several of his teammates, including coaches, were injured following an attack by around 50 supporters of Sporting at the club's training ground after the team finished third in the league and missed out on qualification to the UEFA Champions League. Despite the events, he and the rest of the team agreed to play in the Portuguese Cup final scheduled for the following weekend, eventually losing to C.D. Aves.

Betis
On 13 July 2018, Carvalho joined Real Betis on a five-year contract. The club paid €16 million plus an additional €4 million in variable costs for 75% of the player's rights, with €10 million more to come later for a further 20% of his rights depending on certain conditions and achievements. He made his La Liga debut on 17 August, playing 65 minutes in a 0–3 home loss against Levante UD.

Carvalho was sent off on 15 September 2019 in the 25th minute of a 1–1 home draw with Getafe CF. Days later, he suffered a spinal disc herniation and did not return until February; he played only 13 games over the season and was subsequently linked with Leicester City.

On 20 September 2020, Carvalho scored his first goal for the Verdiblancos in a 2–0 home defeat of Real Valladolid, adding another six days later in a 3–2 loss to Real Madrid also at the Estadio Benito Villamarín.

In September 2022, Carvalho agreed to an extension until 2026.

International career

Eligible for both Portugal and Angola, Carvalho chose to represent the former. When he was still part of the Portugal under-20s, the Angolan Football Federation tried to call him up, but was rejected.

Carvalho made his debut with the Portugal under-21 team on 15 October 2012, in a 0–1 friendly loss with Ukraine. He scored twice during the 2015 UEFA European Championship qualifiers, in home wins against Norway (5–1) and Israel (3–0).

Carvalho was first summoned by full side manager Paulo Bento in November 2013 for the 2014 FIFA World Cup qualification play-offs against Sweden. He won his first cap in the second leg on the 19th, coming on as a 73rd-minute substitute in a 3–2 away victory (4–2 aggregate).

On 19 May 2014, Carvalho was named in the final 23-man squad for the 2014 World Cup held in Brazil. He made his debut in the competition on 22 June, playing the second half of the 2–2 group stage draw against the United States after replacing injured André Almeida. He featured 90 minutes in the next match to help to a 2–1 win over Ghana, but the team was eliminated on goal difference.

Carvalho played all the games and minutes at the 2015 European Under-21 Championship. He was elected player of the tournament due to his performances, even though he missed the decisive attempt in the penalty shootout in the final against Sweden, with it saved by Patrik Carlgren after a 0–0 draw in Prague.

At UEFA Euro 2016 in France, Carvalho was suspended from Portugal's semi-final victory over Wales but regained his place from Danilo Pereira in the final, a 1–0 defeat of the hosts at the Stade de France. He scored his first international goal on 13 November 2016, contributing to a 4–1 home defeat of Latvia for the 2018 World Cup qualifiers.

In May 2018, Carvalho was selected by Fernando Santos for the upcoming World Cup held in Russia. He was also picked for Euro 2020, making two appearances in a round-of-16 exit.

Carvalho was named in the final squad for the 2022 World Cup in Qatar.

Style of play
Carvalho plays primarily as a defensive midfielder, although he can also be deployed as a central midfielder or a central defender. Known for his passing range and accuracy, ability to control a game and composure on the pitch, he earned praise for his imposing physicality.

In spite of lacking pace, Carvalho acted fast when it came to decision-making. He was often compared to Patrick Vieira.

Career statistics

Club

International

Honours
Sporting CP
Taça de Portugal: 2014–15
Taça da Liga: 2017–18

Betis
Copa del Rey: 2021–22

Portugal U21
UEFA European Under-21 Championship runner-up: 2015

Portugal
UEFA European Championship: 2016
UEFA Nations League: 2018–19
FIFA Confederations Cup third place: 2017

Individual
SJPF Player of the Month: October 2013, November 2013, December 2013, March 2014
SJPF Young Player of the Month: August 2013, September 2013, October 2013, November 2013, March 2014, April 2014
LPFP Primeira Liga Breakthrough Player of the Year: 2013–14
UEFA European Under-21 Championship: Player of the tournament/Team of the tournament 2015

Orders
 Commander of the Order of Merit

References

External links

1992 births
Living people
Angolan emigrants to Portugal
Naturalised citizens of Portugal
Portuguese sportspeople of Angolan descent
Black Portuguese sportspeople
Angolan footballers
Portuguese footballers
Footballers from Luanda
Association football midfielders
Primeira Liga players
Segunda Divisão players
Sporting CP footballers
C.D. Fátima players
Belgian Pro League players
Cercle Brugge K.S.V. players
La Liga players
Real Betis players
Portugal youth international footballers
Portugal under-21 international footballers
Portugal international footballers
2014 FIFA World Cup players
UEFA Euro 2016 players
2017 FIFA Confederations Cup players
2018 FIFA World Cup players
UEFA Euro 2020 players
2022 FIFA World Cup players
UEFA European Championship-winning players
UEFA Nations League-winning players
Portuguese expatriate footballers
Expatriate footballers in Belgium
Expatriate footballers in Spain
Portuguese expatriate sportspeople in Belgium
Portuguese expatriate sportspeople in Spain
Commanders of the Order of Merit (Portugal)